Rahman Gumbo is a Zimbabwean retired footballer and currently manages Sue Flamingos.

Career
He was initially appointed to the managerial position of Zimbabwe in 2005, but was sacked following a 3–0 loss against Nigeria.

He was appointed as manager of the Zimbabwe national team in 2012 for a second time on 8 February.

On 8 March 2014, he was appointed manager of Botswana Premier League club Gaborone United.

On 10 May 2016, Gumbo was appointed manager of Zimbabwe Premier League club Chicken Inn.
He took up his post as manager on 1 July 2016.

On 28 September 2018, Gumbo has been sent on" forced special leave" by his South African National First Division side Witbank Spurs due to poor results that has seen the ambitious outfit registering just a single win in five league starts.

In June 2019, Gumbo – who at the time was the assistant manager – took charge of the Zimbabwean national team for the semi-final against Zambia. This was necessitated by coach Sunday Chidzambwa's return to Zimbabwe after he was granted compassionate leave following the death of his father.

References

External links

1963 births
Living people
Zimbabwean footballers
Zimbabwe international footballers
Zimbabwe national football team managers
Place of birth missing (living people)
Association football midfielders
Zimbabwean football managers